State Road 38 (SR 38) in the U.S. state of Indiana serves as a connection between Lafayette in the west and Richmond in the east.

Route description
SR 38 begins in Lafayette at the intersections of Sagamore Parkway and Main Street, just north of US 52. There is an interchange with I-65 at exit 168. It proceeds east-southeast through Frankfort and Sheridan, then through the north Indianapolis suburb of Noblesville. It continues through Pendleton where it crosses I-69, then on through New Castle and Hagerstown. SR 38 terminates in Richmond, where it meets US 35.

Major intersections

References

External links

038
Transportation in Tippecanoe County, Indiana
Transportation in Montgomery County, Indiana
Transportation in Clinton County, Indiana
Transportation in Boone County, Indiana
Transportation in Hamilton County, Indiana
Transportation in Madison County, Indiana
Transportation in Henry County, Indiana
Transportation in Wayne County, Indiana